Steve Taneyhill (born July 21, 1973, in Altoona, Pennsylvania) is a former American football quarterback and the current co-owner of Group Therapy in Five Points, Columbia in South Carolina. He also formerly coached at Union County High School in Union, South Carolina.  Taneyhill was a quarterback for the University of South Carolina from 1992 to 1995.  He set many school records.

Career

Player 
As a USC Gamecocks quarterback, Taneyhill compiled 8,380 yards in total offense, completing 753 of 1,245 passes. He threw 62 touchdown passes in his career. Taneyhill wore his hair in a mullet.

Coach 
In 2006, he led the Chesterfield High School football team to the South Carolina state championship, where they lost to Carvers Bay. In 2007 Taneyhill's team returned with a 13–6 win over Carvers Bay for the state title and in 2008. In 2009 Chesterfield won their third state title with a 36–6 win over Lamar.   

Taneyhill also coached at Cambridge Academy private school in Greenwood, S.C. He led the 8-man team to back-to-back state titles and a runner-up the year after. He was the quarterbacks coach at West Ashley in Charleston, S.C., for one year in between his jobs at Cambridge and Chesterfield.  Taneyhill was also the high school coach of NFL first-round draft pick Gaines Adams, who went on to play for Tampa Bay and Chicago during his professional career before Adams' untimely death in 2010.
 
Taneyhill assumed the head coaching spot for the Union County High School Yellow Jackets in Union, South Carolina, on March 1, 2012.

Taneyhill was let go as head coach of Union County High School after the 2015 season.

Business 
In 2016, Taneyhill purchased the Five Points, Columbia bar Group Therapy, and renamed it "Steve Taneyhill's Group Therapy."

References

1973 births
Living people
American football quarterbacks
High school football coaches in Pennsylvania
South Carolina Gamecocks football players
Sportspeople from Altoona, Pennsylvania
Players of American football from Pennsylvania